Brent Clements Rodd (1809–1898) was a prominent colonial lawyer and landowner in 19th century Sydney, Australia. Rodd Island in Sydney Harbour is named after him.

References 

19th-century Australian lawyers
Lawyers from Sydney
1809 births
1898 deaths